Released in 2007 by Deep Shag Records, On the Road with Ellison Volume 3 is a collection of humorous and thought provoking moments from the vaults of Harlan Ellison. The CD features a new essay written by Harlan for this release. When Harlan Ellison speaks, no topic is off-limits. This is not Harlan reading his work; it's a collection of interesting observations and stories from his life.

Track listing
Opening Shots
Down The Escalator W/ Camera In Arizona
The Egg & I
Watching Me, Myself & Four Ellisons
A Cultural Amnesia Nightmare
QVC Ya On The Couch
A Harlan Chandelier Evening
Again With The Quickies
A Leprechaun None?
Disney Drive-Thru With Pink Slip
Mate Expectations
Bogart, Books & Bargains
Deep Philosophy About The Middle East
Him: About Her
Observations On The Abyss

References
 Fingerprints on the Sky: The Authorized Harlan Ellison Bibliography, Richmond, T. (2017). Edgeworks Abbey/Subterranean Press.

External links
Deep Shag Records listing for the album
All Music Guide review
Subterranean Press review (Spring 2007)

2007 live albums
Harlan Ellison albums
Deep Shag Records albums